Dmitri Vitalyevich Simonov (born 12 November 1994) is a Russian football player.

Club career
He made his debut in the Russian Professional Football League for FC SKA Rostov-on-Don on 19 March 2017 in a game against FC Rotor Volgograd.

References

External links
 
 
 Profile by Russian Professional Football League

1994 births
Living people
Russian footballers
Association football defenders
FC Fakel Voronezh players
FC SKA Rostov-on-Don players
KF Korabi Peshkopi players
KS Burreli players
Russian expatriate footballers
Expatriate footballers in Georgia (country)
Expatriate footballers in Albania
Kategoria e Parë players
Sportspeople from Voronezh